Viktor Yevgenyevich Morozov (born 8 October 2001) is a Russian football player who plays for FC Chayka Peschanokopskoye. He also holds Swedish citizenship as he was born there.

Club career
He made his debut in the Russian Football National League for FC Chayka Peschanokopskoye on 27 February 2021 in a game against FC Shinnik Yaroslavl.

References

External links
 
 Profile by Russian Football National League

2001 births
People from Trollhättan
Sportspeople from Västra Götaland County
Living people
Russian footballers
Association football forwards
PFC Sochi players
Russian First League players
Russian expatriate footballers
Expatriate footballers in Norway
FC Chayka Peschanokopskoye players
FC Olimp-Dolgoprudny players